The Hong Kong Sheng Kung Hui, also known as the Hong Kong Anglican Church (Episcopal), an Anglican Church in Hong Kong and Macau, has its own calendar of saints.

History

Characteristics

See also

 Calendar of saints (Anglican Church of Korea)

Further reading 
  
 

Hong Kong
Anglicanism